James Birungi, is a Major General in the Uganda People's Defence Force Air Force (UPDAF). He serves as the Chief of Military Intelligence in the UPDF, effective January 2022.

Before that, from 16 December 2020 until 25 January 2022, he served on special assignment "to monitor on behalf of the guarantors of the South Sudan peace process, the assembling, screening, demobilization and integration of the armed forces of South Sudan".

From June 2019 to 16 December 2020, he served as the commander of the Special Forces Command (SFC), a specialized command unit of the UPDF, that is responsible for the security of the President of Uganda, his immediate family, the constitutional monarchs and vital national installations, including the country's oil fields.

He was replaced by Lt. Gen. Muhoozi Kainerugaba who had earlier been in charge of the same force. He replaced Major General Don William Nabasa, who left Uganda to attend a course at the National Defence College in China.

He was chief of air force staff of Uganda Air Force from 2016 to 2019, replaced by Colonel Emmanuel Kwihangana.

Military career
From 2016 to 2019, he served as the Chief of Staff of the Uganda People's Defence Air Force. He received promotion from Brigadier to Major General, in February 2019 when a total of over 2,000 men and women of the UPDF received promotions. In his position as Head of the Chieftaincy of Military Intelligence (CMI), in the UPDF, he replaced Major General Abel Kandiho, who was posted to South Sudan, as a special envoy.

Courses attended 
As part of his military training, Birungi attended the following courses, among others.

1. Basic military training in Kasenyi, Entebbe

2. Cadet course in India

3. Anti-Tank Course in Masaka

4. Motorised infantry Commanders Course

5. Tank Crew Course in Karama

6. Platoon Commanders course in Karama

7. Company Commanders Course in Karama

7. Tank Battalion Commanders Course in Karama

8. Junior Commanders course in Jinja

9. Senior Command and Staff Course at USCSC, in Kimaka.

See also
 David Muhoozi
 Charles Lutaaya
 Sabiiti Muzeyi

References

External links
 Website of Uganda Ministry of Defence

Living people
1973 births
People from Nakaseke District
Ugandan military personnel
Ugandan generals
Uganda Senior Command and Staff College alumni